Linda Antonsen (born 5 July 1980) is a Norwegian orienteering competitor. She competed at the 2001 World Orienteering Championships in Tampere, where she placed 11th in the sprint, and won a bronze medal in the relay event together with Birgitte Husebye, Elisabeth Ingvaldsen and Hanne Staff.

References

External links
 

1980 births
Living people
Norwegian orienteers
Female orienteers
Foot orienteers
World Orienteering Championships medalists
Competitors at the 2005 World Games
21st-century Norwegian women